Herman Peter Eberharter (April 29, 1892 – September 9, 1958) was a Democratic member of the U.S. House of Representatives from Pennsylvania.

Biography
Eberharter was born in Pittsburgh, Pennsylvania; his father was an immigrant from Austria and his maternal grandparents were German immigrants. During the First World War, he served in the United States Army as a private in the 20th Infantry Regiment and was commissioned as a second lieutenant.  He continued to serve in the military as a member of the Officers' Reserve Corps, and attained the rank of major. He graduated from Duquesne University Law School in 1925 and became an attorney in Pittsburgh. He became a member of the Pennsylvania House of Representatives in 1935 and 1936.

He was elected as a Democrat to the Seventy-fifth and to the ten succeeding Congresses. He served from January 3, 1937, until his death in Arlington, Virginia. He was buried at Mount Carmel Cemetery in Pittsburgh

In 1945, Ebeharter introduced the legislation that gave official Congressional approval of the Pledge of Allegiance.  Beginning with the 78th United States Congress, he sat as a member of the United States House Committee on Ways and Means.

Eberharter was a member of the Dies Committee, which received the "Yellow Report" alleging Japanese-American espionage during World War II based on cultural traits such as Buddhist faith and a high proportion of fishermen among the population. Eberharter was the only member of the committee to openly express opposition to wartime internment of Japanese Americans.

A confidential 1943 analysis of the House Foreign Affairs Committee by Isaiah Berlin for the British Foreign Office described Eberharter as

See also
 List of United States Congress members who died in office (1950–99)
 List of members of the House Un-American Activities Committee

References
 Retrieved on 2008-07-02

1892 births
1958 deaths
Politicians from Pittsburgh
Democratic Party members of the United States House of Representatives from Pennsylvania
Democratic Party members of the Pennsylvania House of Representatives
United States Army officers
United States Army personnel of World War I
Military personnel from Pennsylvania
Duquesne University alumni
Pennsylvania lawyers
20th-century American politicians
American people of Austrian descent
American people of German descent
20th-century American lawyers